Broken Bow High School is a public high school in Broken Bow, Nebraska, United States.

Description
Broken Bow is a public school which had approximately 291 students enrolled as of 2009.

Athletics
The school colors are red and white, and the athletic teams are the Indians.

References

External links
 Official website
 Great Schools Profile

Public high schools in Nebraska
Schools in Custer County, Nebraska